Companions is an album by American jazz trumpeter Raphe Malik, which was recorded live at the 1998 Vision Festival during a Jimmy Lyons tribute and released on the Eremite label. Malik leads a quartet with the members of the Trio Hurricane: tenor saxophonist Glenn Spearman, bassist William Parker and drummer Paul Murphy.

Reception

In his review for AllMusic, Steve Loewy states "The trumpeter boasts a distinct style, a rough-edged, fat sound, coupled with a concept that absorbs the innovations of Don Cherry and Bobby Bradford, yet retains its own originality. When joined with his musical blood brother, the late Glenn Spearman, the trumpeter creates harmonies that open the heavens."

The Penguin Guide to Jazz says about Spearman "He looks desperately ill on the cover but is still in fierily good voice, burning through an impassioned if slightly shapeless solo on the opening 'Lyons Jump'."

The All About Jazz review by Kurt Gottschalk notes "the real star here is the leader. Malik's playing is crystalline and uplifting. For 40 minutes, they create a celebration, a fast-pitched rollick of uplifting music."

Track listing
All compositions by Raphe Malik
 "Lyon's Jump" – 13:24
 "Emblematic" – 10:38
 "Health Food" – 9:53 
 "Bend" – 7:19

Personnel
Raphe Malik – trumpet
Paul Murphy - trap drums
William Parker – bass
Glenn Spearman – tenor sax

References

 
2002 live albums
Raphe Malik live albums
Eremite Records live albums
Albums recorded at the Vision Festival